Erik John Plantenberg (born October 30, 1968) is an American former Major League Baseball relief pitcher. He attended college at San Diego State University. In , he made his MLB debut with the Seattle Mariners.

External links

1968 births
Living people
Seattle Mariners players
Philadelphia Phillies players
Baseball players from Washington (state)
Major League Baseball pitchers
San Diego State Aztecs baseball players
Buffalo Bisons (minor league) players
Canton-Akron Indians players
New Orleans Zephyrs players
Rochester Red Wings players
Sportspeople from Renton, Washington
Winnipeg Goldeyes players
Waterbury Spirit players
American expatriate baseball players in Canada
Calgary Cannons players
Durham Bulls players
Elmira Pioneers players
Fresno Grizzlies players
Jacksonville Suns players
Las Vegas Stars (baseball) players
Lynchburg Red Sox players
Memphis Chicks players
Scranton/Wilkes-Barre Red Barons players